164 (one hundred [and] sixty-four) is the natural number following 163 and preceding 165.

In mathematics

164 is a zero of the Mertens function.

In base 10, 164 is the smallest number that can be expressed as a concatenation of two squares in two different ways: as 1 concatenate 64 or 16 concatenate 4.

In astronomy
 164P/Christensen is a comet in the Solar System
 164 Eva is a large and dark Main belt asteroid

In geography
 Chaplin no. 164, Saskatchewan in Saskatchewan, Canada

In the military
  was a cargo vessel during World War II
  was a T2 tanker during World War II
  was a Barracuda-class submarine during World War II
  was an Alamosa-class cargo ship during World War II
  was an Admirable-class minesweeper during World War II
  was a Trefoil-class concrete barge during World War II
  was a  during World War II
  was a  during World War II
  was a yacht during World War I
  was a  during World War II

In sports
 Baseball Talk was a set of 164 talking baseball cards released by Topps Baseball Card Company in 1989

In transportation
 Caproni Ca.164 was a training biplane produced in Italy prior to World War II
 The Alfa Romeo 164 car produced from 1988 to 1997
 The Volvo 164 car produced from 1968 to 1975
 List of highways numbered 164
 Is a London Transport bus route running between Sutton and Wimbledon

In other fields
164 is also:
 The year AD 164 or 164 BC
 164 AH is a year in the Islamic calendar that corresponds to 780 – 781 CE
 The Scrabble board, a 15-by-15 grid, includes 164 squares that have neither word nor letter multiplier. The remainder have attributes such as double letter, triple letter, double word, and triple word
 The atomic number of an element temporarily called Unhexquadium
 Solvent Red 164 is a synthetic red diazo dye
 E.164 is an ITU-T recommendation defines public telecommunication numbering plan used in the PSTN and data networks

See also
 United States Supreme Court cases, Volume 164
 United Nations Security Council Resolution 164

External links

 Number Facts and Trivia: 164
 The Number 164
 The Positive Integer 164

Integers